Pikes Peak Greenway is a 16 mile trail in Colorado Springs, Colorado that parallels Monument and Fountain Creeks and winds through and alongside parks, like Monument Valley Park, and sports complexes. It connects with other trails, such as the Midland Trail, Bear Creek Trail and Templeton Gap Trail.

Overview
The greenway is a 16 mile that runs north to south. Pine Creek Reach, north of Woodman Road, is the north-most point on the trail. Sand Creek Reach at the El Pomar Youth Sports Complex, south of Circle Drive, is the south-most point on the trail. It is classified as an easy trail that parallels Monument Creek, Fountain Creek and I-25. The estimated cycling time is 1.25 hours, without stops. Criterium Bike shop is located along the trail at 6150 Corporate Drive for any needed bike repairs.

History
In the 1980s the concept of a greenway was developed, but it wasn't until 1997 that a Great Outdoors Colorado Trust Fund (GOCO) Legacy Grant was able to provide sufficient funds to get the project started. Trails, Open Space and Parks taxes matched the grant funds. The Palmer Foundation and the City of Colorado Springs also provided funding for the Pikes Peak Greenway. Then, private land that was needed to complete the trail was purchased.

In 2000 the Greenway trail was connected to the New Santa Fe Regional Trail, which allows joggers, bikers, cyclists and skaters to travel past the United States Air Force Academy and up to Palmer Lake. A golden spike was ceremoniously driven into the ground to signify "the opening of a long-sought stretch of trail."

Trail reaches
The points along the trail, from north to south, are:
 Pine Creek Reach — The Woodman Trail is to the west of the Greenway Trail. The northernmost point of the Pine Creek Reach meets up with the New Santa Fe Trail, which goes north to Palmer Lake.
 High Plains Reach
 Northridge Reach (north)
 Northridge Reach (south) — The Austin Bluffs Trail is not directly accessed from the Greenway Trail, but it is a short distance east of the trail on Garden of the Gardens Road and off of Nevada Avenue.
 Reservoir Reach — travels along Skateboard Park and Pikeview Reservoir
 Templeton Gap Reach  — passes by the Gossage Youth Sports Complex. The Sinton trail leads to the nearby Sinton Pond Open Space. The Templeton Gap Trail can also be accessed from this portion of the trail. 
 Roswell Reach  — travels along Roswell Park
 Monument Valley Reach (north)  — winds through Monument Valley Park, with trails on both sides of Monument Creek  —  From the trail on the western side of Mountain Creek, one can travel to the Mesa Springs Greenway or the Mesa Valley Trail at Sonderman Park
 Monument Valley  Reach (south)  — winds through Monument Valley Park, with trails on both sides of Monument Creek. The Mesa Springs Greenway is accessed from the trail on the western side of Mountain Creek.
 Downtown Reach  —  travels through America the Beautiful Park (Confluence Park) where the Midland Trail begins
 Power Plant Reach  —  which mid-trail connects to the Bear Creek Trail that leads to the Bear Creek Nature Center
 Tejon Marsh Reach  — passes through Dorchester Park
 Spring Creek Reach (north)
 Spring Creek Reach (south)
 Sand Creek Reach  —  where the El Pomar Sports Center is located and where the trail connects to the Sand Creek Trail

See also
 Parks in Colorado Springs, Colorado
 List of parks in Colorado Springs, Colorado

References

External links

 Pikes Peak Greenway map
 Interactive Urban Trails map
 Urban Trails map (pdf)

Parks in Colorado Springs, Colorado
Hiking trails in Colorado